This is a chronological listing of the titles that were showcased on the first four seasons of NBC Saturday Night at the Movies.

Season 1
The first 30-week season (1961–1962) consisted of post-1948 titles from 20th Century Fox. Those films in the widescreen CinemaScope format were resized for the small screen. In terms of content, very little editing was done because the films met the broadcast standards of the time for the most part.  There were several weeks when the films ran far beyond the scheduled 11pm end time. The list of films in the "episode guide" come from the TV Listings page of the Lima News, Lima, Ohio.

Season 2
The second season (1962–1963) began on September 22, 1962, just as the first season started off, with Marilyn Monroe, this time with the television debut of Gentlemen Prefer Blondes.  The broadcast had become a special tribute to Monroe, who had died just a month earlier.  It was also a second season of 30 titles from 20th Century Fox.

To avoid confusion with the TV series Rawhide, 20th Century Fox renamed the film, Desperate Siege for television.

Season 3
The third season (1963-1964) began on September 21, 1963.  For the third season in a row, the network opened its Saturday night movie series with a Marilyn Monroe-starring film, 1955's The Seven Year Itch.  By this time, NBC had added a second movie night, Monday, to its prime-time schedule.  A new package of films were acquired at a cost of $14 million to the network consisting of 42 titles from 20th Century Fox, as well as 35 post 1950 films from MGM to fill both nights.  For the most part, heavy dramatic films, such as The Diary of Anne Frank (1959 film) were chosen for season three of Saturday Night At The Movies, while lighter fare, such as comedies and musicals were reserved for the new Monday Night series. [1]

In the spring and summer of 1964, NBC elected to rebroadcast select titles previously seen on the Monday Night at the Movies series, in hopes of better ratings.  The films seen for the first time on Saturday are listed below.

Season 4
With 20th Century Fox no longer providing movies to NBC for the 1964-1965 season, the peacock network struck a new deal with Paramount Pictures for 31 high profile films from the 1950's, many of them in the widescreen VistaVision format, now re-sized for the small screen.  They also acquired 29 more films from MGM, for a total of 60 titles over two nights, including the new Wednesday Night at the Movies.  The 4th season premiere on October 3, 1964, was also the first Paramount Picture to debut on NBC: 1955's Strategic Air Command (film).  This season also saw the TV Debut of White Christmas (film) (1954).  The film would become a Saturday Night Holiday tradition on NBC, well into the 1970's

 The network showing of War and Peace had an early start of 8pm.  Approx. 35 minutes had to be cut to fit the 3 hours, 30 minutes time slot

As with the previous season, the network borrowed a handful of films from it second movie night series (Wednesday Night At The Movies in this case) to make their Saturday debut.  These films are listed below.

In later seasons, films such as The Time Machine (MGM, 1960), Sunset Boulevard (Paramount, 1950), and Sorry, Wrong Number (Paramount, 1948), would occasionally be shown. All three made their television debuts on Saturday Night at the Movies.

[1] UPI Interview with Don Bays, in charge of movies at NBC. Western Kansas Press, Great Bend, April, 27, 1963 

NBC Saturday Night at the Movies
Lists of films